This is a list of Zoroastrians with a Wikipedia article.



From Greater Iran 
 Cyrus the Great, (Old Persian: 𐎤𐎢𐎽𐎢𐏁 Kūruš; Kourosh; New Persian: کوروش Kuruš; Hebrew: כורש, Modern: Kōréš, Tiberian: Kōréš; c. 600–530 BC) : commonly known as Cyrus the Great, and also called Cyrus the Elder by the Greeks, was the founder of the Achaemenid Empire, the first Persian Empire. Under his rule, the empire embraced all the previous civilized states of the ancient Near East, expanded vastly and eventually conquered most of Western Asia and much of Central Asia
 Darius the Great, (Old Persian: Dārayava(h)uš, New Persian: داریوش Dāryuš; Hebrew: דָּרְיָוֶשׁ, Modern: Darəyaveš, Tiberian: Dāryāwéš; c. 550–486 BCE) : was the fourth Persian king of the Achaemenid Empire
 Farhang Mehr, (1923-2018): former Deputy Prime Minister of Iran
 Jamshid Bahman Jamshidian, (1851–1933): pioneer of modern banking in Iran
 Keikhosrow Shahrokh, (1864–1929): proponent of the Iranian civil calendar and designer of the Ferdowsi mausoleum
 Xerxes I, (/ˈzɜːrksiːz/; Old Persian: 𐎧𐏁𐎹𐎠𐎼𐏁𐎠 Xšayaṛša (About this soundKhshāyarsha (help·info))  "ruling over heroes",Greek Ξέρξης Xérxēs [ksérksɛːs]; 519–465 BC): called Xerxes the Great, was the fifth king of kings of the Achaemenid dynasty of Persia

Zoroastrians